Make Another World is the fifth full-length studio album by the Scottish rock band Idlewild, released on 5 March 2007 through Sequel Records. The album is the first with bass guitarist Gareth Russell, following Gavin Fox's departure at the end of 2005, and is their first since leaving Parlophone. Vocalist Roddy Woomble said that the band "made a conscious decision to make a strong, loud, rock record."

According to the guitarist Rod Jones, the album references each of the band's previous albums, and is a "summing up of the past twelve years". The album was noted for its return to Idlewild's heavier roots, while continuing to maintain a strong sense of melody as displayed on more recent albums. Q described the album as "the sound of a band re-energised."

The album reached  24 on the UK Album Chart and, according to Woomble, has sold "40,000 copies, even though the record label effectively closed down just after it was released." "No Emotion" was released to American radio on 6 March 2007.

The album was performed in full on 21 December 2008, alongside their first album, Captain, at King Tut's Wah Wah Hut in Glasgow. In an interview following the gig, the guitarist Rod Jones said that the album - alongside Warnings/Promises - is his favourite release, saying that he "feels that we have become better at our craft as time goes on and I feel more confident in our song-writing as time goes by."

Background and recording
Make Another World was recorded at Sub Station in Rosyth, with producer and engineer Dave Eringa. He later mixed the recordings at Strongroom in London, before the album was mastered by Howie Weinberg at Masterdisck in New York.

Guitarist Allan Stewart noted that "the new songs are getting a great reception when we play them live. I think people were expecting more acoustic stuff, so the fact that it’s more upbeat surprises some people. I think people like the loud songs live, but there is still a mix on it. It is balanced – it’s pretty heavy in places!” and said that the band “wrote this record when we didn’t have a label, so there were no A&R people on the phone. We were on our own, we wrote the record and then when Sanctuary came to us it was all but done. It was nice in that way that we had so much freedom."

Artwork
According to the vocalist Roddy Woomble, the band "enlisted our tour manager (and t-shirt designer) Dominic to do the album art. Dom’s covered in tattoos and loves all the iconic, sailor Jerry, tattoo artwork, so it went along those lines, with photos of a naked girl in a Mexican wrestlers mask inside the booklet. You’d have to ask him about the symbolism, but I for one, thought it was striking and stark, like a lot of the songs."

Track listing
All songs written by Idlewild.

"In Competition for the Worst Time" – 2:43
"Everything (As It Moves)" – 3:22
"No Emotion" – 3:04
"Make Another World" – 4:06
"If It Takes You Home" – 2:07
"Future Works" – 4:16
"You and I Are Both Away" – 3:50
"A Ghost in the Arcade" – 2:48
"Once in Your Life" – 4:29
"Finished It Remains" – 3:53

B-Sides
"Hidden Ways"
"Lookin' for a Love" (Neil Young)

Personnel
Personnel per booklet.

Idlewild
 Rod Jones – guitar, keyboards, vocals
 Colin Newton – drums, percussion
 Gareth Russell – bass guitar
 Allan Stewart – guitars, vocals
 Roddy Woomble – lead vocals

Additional musicians
 Inara George – vocals
 Mick Cooke – trumpet, French horn
 Tom Smith – trombone

Production and design
 Dave Eringa – producer, engineer, mixing
 Howie Weinberg – mastering
 An Evil Empire – design, photography

References

External links
 Interview with Rod Jones - 28 June 2007

Idlewild (band) albums
2007 albums
Albums produced by Dave Eringa